Elections to the French National Assembly were held in Senegal on 2 January 1956 as part of the wider French elections. Two members were elected from the territory, both of which were won by the Senegalese Democratic Bloc. Mamadou Dia and Léopold Sédar Senghor were the two elected members.

Results

References

1956 in Senegal
Elections in Senegal
Senegal
Senegal